Bad Brambach is a municipality in the Vogtlandkreis district, in Saxony, Germany. It is the southernmost municipality in Saxony and also in what was formerly East Germany. It is a spa town with radon baths.

Demographics 

Historical population (31 December):

 Data source: Digital historical files of Saxony (until 1964), from 1998: Statistical Office of Saxony

References 

Municipalities in Saxony
Spa towns in Germany
Vogtlandkreis